Taytay held its local elections on Monday, May 13, 2019, as a part of the 2019 Philippine general election. Voters elected candidates for the local elective posts in the municipality: the mayor, the vice mayor, the congressmen and the provincial board member of Rizal's 1st district, and the eight councilors.

There are a total of 107,520 people who voted out of the 153,664 registered voters. George Ricardo Gacula won the mayoral race for the 2nd consecutive time over incumbent vice mayor Carlito "Bonoy" Gonzaga. Michell Bermudo won the vice mayoral race over Jan Victor Cabitac, both who are incumbent councilors.

Mayoral and Vice Mayoral elections

Mayor

Vice Mayor

City Council

By ticket

Development Team

Barkadahang Taytay

Team Ram

By Name

References

2019 Philippine local elections
Elections in Taytay, Rizal
May 2019 events in the Philippines
2019 elections in Calabarzon